Eiger Fotballklubb, formerly Eiger Idrettslag, is a Norwegian association football club from Eigerøy, Rogaland.

It was founded on 19 March 1961.

The men's football team will in 2011 play in the Fourth Division, the fifth tier of Norwegian football. It last played in the Norwegian Second Division in 1998.

References

External links
 Official site 

Football clubs in Norway
Sport in Rogaland
Eigersund
Association football clubs established in 1961
1961 establishments in Norway